MSC Meraviglia is a cruise ship owned and operated by MSC Cruises, built at the Chantiers de l'Atlantique shipyard in St. Nazaire, France, by STX France. MSC Meraviglia is the lead ship of MSC's new "Vista Project" vessels, the Meraviglia class, with  following in 2019. Each vessel has a passenger capacity of 4,500.

History 
The ship initially operated in the western Mediterranean also cruised in Northern Europe as of summer 2019, but repositioned to the United States for the first time, to New York and Miami, in fall 2019, to sail to the Caribbean as part of a North American expansion program by MSC.

Design and construction 
The vessel's name was announced, and steel was cut, at a ceremony held at Chantiers de l'Atlantique on 20 April 2015. The ship was formally named on 3 June 2017 by her godmother, Italian actress Sophia Loren at a ceremony in Le Havre, which also featured French actor Patrick Bruel, musical group Kids United, and comedian Gad Elmaleh.

The building of MSC Meraviglia was shown in the second episode of the Science Channel series, Building Giants, and titled "Monster Cruise Ship".

The ship's facilities include a promenade with a long LED roof, a water park with water slides, a rope course and a theater. The ship also has over ten dining areas and a spa.

Incidents

COVID-19 pandemic
On 26 February, during the COVID-19 pandemic in Mexico, Mexican authorities granted permission for MSC Meraviglia, registered in Malta, to dock in Cozumel, Quintana Roo, because she carried a passenger presumed to be infected with COVID-19. The ship was previously denied access to ports in Jamaica and the Cayman Islands. Two cases of common seasonal flu were found.

The CDC reported, as early as 22 April, that at least one person who tested positive for SARS-CoV-2 had tested positive within 14 days after disembarking.

References

External links

 MSC Cruises official site

 

2016 ships
Ships built by Chantiers de l'Atlantique
Ships built in France
Meraviglia